Fasciculation and elongation protein zeta-2 is a protein that in humans is encoded by the FEZ2 gene.

This gene is an ortholog of the C. elegans unc-76 gene, which is necessary for normal axonal bundling and elongation within axon bundles. Other orthologs include the rat gene that encodes zygin II, which can bind to synaptotagmin.

Interactions
FEZ2 has been shown to interact with Protein kinase Mζ.

References

Further reading